Trabuco Peak is a  summit in the Santa Ana Mountains on the border of Orange and Riverside Counties, California, about halfway between Rancho Santa Margarita and Lake Elsinore. The mountain sits on the divide between Arroyo Trabuco (Trabuco Canyon) on the west and the Temescal Creek valley on the east. Situated in the Cleveland National Forest, it is the highest summit in the Santa Anas south of Santiago Peak.

The main trails providing access to the peak, the West Horsethief and Holy Jim trails, both begin at the bottom of Trabuco Canyon. The Main Divide Road, a fire road, also passes close to the peak.

References

Mountains of Orange County, California
Mountains of Riverside County, California
Mountains of Southern California